A referendum on holding separate negotiations on its future status was held in the Palau part of the Trust Territory of the Pacific Islands in September 1976. The proposal was approved by 88% of voters.

Results

References

1976 referendums
1976 in Palau
1976
1976